Lene Onsrud Retzius (born 4 January 1996) is a Norwegian pole vaulter.

She finished eighth at the 2013 World Youth Championships, tenth at the 2015 European Junior Championships, and eighth at the 2017 European U23 Championships. She also competed at the 2014 World Junior Championships, the 2018 European Championships and the 2019 World Championships without reaching the final.

She became Norwegian champion in 2014, 2015, 2016, 2017 and 2019, and won silver medals in 2011 and 2018. She represented Moelven IL through 2014, then IL i BUL from 2015 on.

Her personal best jump is 4.50 metres, achieved in May 2018 in Oslo. Indoors she has 4.51 metres, achieved in August 2019 in Sandnes. These are both current Norwegian records.

She has a twin brother.

References

External links
 
 
 
 

1996 births
Living people
People from Ringsaker
Norwegian female pole vaulters
World Athletics Championships athletes for Norway
Place of birth missing (living people)
Norwegian twins
Twin sportspeople
Norwegian Athletics Championships winners
Athletes (track and field) at the 2020 Summer Olympics
Olympic athletes of Norway
Sportspeople from Innlandet